The Nuu-chah-nulth people are a group of First Nations peoples living on the west coast of Vancouver Island, British Columbia, Canada.

Nuu-chah-nulth may also refer to:
 Nuu-chah-nulth language
 Nuu-chah-nulth Tribal Council

See also
Ditidaht, Nitinat people
Makah people

Language and nationality disambiguation pages